Llygad Llwchwr is a 1.2 km-long cave system in the Black Mountain which forms the westernmost range of the Brecon Beacons National Park in Wales.

The entrance to the cave system is 400m from the road alongside a public footpath, and just above and to the left of an obvious river resurgence.

The cave contains a dry high level series and an active river level which is accessible at a number of river chambers separated by sumps.  Beyond the fourth river chamber exploration is only possible by cave diving.  The rest of the cave is suitable for novice cavers.

External links
 http://www.ukcaves.co.uk/cave-llygadllwchwr
 http://ukcaving.com/wiki/index.php/Llygad_Llwchwr

Caves of Wales